Bossa Nova Carnival is an album by American jazz vibraphonist Dave Pike performing compositions by João Donato which was recorded in 1962 for the New Jazz label.

Reception

AllMusic awarded the album 4½ stars and in the review by Alex Henderson, he states, "Bossa Nova Carnival wasn't an exercise in knee-jerk, insincere bandwagon jumping. Pike wanted to make a meaningful, individualistic contribution to Brazilian jazz. So instead of doing exactly what Getz, Gilberto, and Charlie Byrd were doing and performing a lot of Jobim songs, he enlisted Brazilian composer João Donato. Everything on this excellent vinyl LP was written by Donato, who provides sensuous, caressing melodies that Pike and his sidemen (who include Kenny Burrell on guitar and Clark Terry on flügelhorn) bring a lot of warmth and sensitivity to. The music swings, but it does so in a subtle, mellow, consistently melodic fashion. Undeniably one of Pike's most essential albums".

Track listing
All compositions by João Donato

 "Samba Lero" – 4:41
 "Sono" – 5:36
 "Serenidade" – 5:14
 "Carnival Samba" – 4:27
 "Philumba" – 5:18
 "Melvalita" – 4:02
 "Ginha" – 3:56
 "Sausalito" – 6:04

Note
Recorded at Van Gelder Studio in Englewood Cliffs, New Jersey on September 6, 1962 (tracks 2, 4, 5 & 7) and September 7, 1962 (tracks 1, 3, 6 & 8)

Personnel 
Dave Pike – vibraphone, marimba
Clark Terry – flugelhorn (tracks 2, 4, 5 & 7)
Kenny Burrell – guitar
Chris White – bass
Rudy Collins – drums
Jose Paulo – cabasa, bandero

References 

1962 albums
Dave Pike albums
New Jazz Records albums
Albums recorded at Van Gelder Studio
Albums produced by Elliot Mazer